Saint-Andéol-le-Château (or Sent-Anduér) is a former commune in the Rhône department in eastern France. On 1 January 2018, it was merged into the new commune of Beauvallon.

See also
Communes of the Rhône department

References

Former communes of Rhône (department)
Populated places disestablished in 2018